Richard Kyes "Rik" Bonness (born March 20, 1954) is an American former college and professional football player who was linebacker for four seasons in the National Football League (NFL).  A consensus All-American at Nebraska as a center, he played professionally for the Oakland Raiders and Tampa Bay Buccaneers.

Born in Borger, Texas, Bonness played high school football at Bellevue High School in Bellevue, Nebraska, a suburb south of Omaha.  He graduated in 1972 and then received a scholarship to the University of Nebraska in Lincoln, the two-time defending national champions under head coach Bob Devaney. Bonness and played center for the Conrnhuskers on the offensive line under new head coach Tom Osborne.

Following his senior season in 1975, Bonness was a consensus first-team All-American, having received first-team honors from Associated Press (AP), United Press International (UPI), Walter Camp Football Foundation (WCFF), American Football Coaches Association (AFCA), Football Writers Association of America (FWAA), and Football News.

The Oakland Raiders chose Bonness in the third round of the 1976 NFL Draft (84th overall).  He played linebacker as a pro and appeared in 59 games across four seasons for the Raiders, Tampa Bay Buccaneers (–) and New York Giants.  He saw no regular season action in 1980.

During his rookie season, the Raiders won Super Bowl XI in January 1977.

References

External links
 

1954 births
Living people
All-American college football players
American football linebackers
Nebraska Cornhuskers football players
New York Giants players
Oakland Raiders players
People from Borger, Texas
People from Bellevue, Nebraska
Players of American football from Nebraska
Players of American football from Texas
Tampa Bay Buccaneers players